Saint-Pol may refer to the following places in France :

 Saint-Pol-de-Léon, in the Finistère department
 Saint-Pol-sur-Mer, in the Nord department
 Saint-Pol-sur-Ternoise, in the Pas-de-Calais department
 Hôtel Saint-Pol, a former royal residence in Paris

See also
County of Saint-Pol, a county around the city of Saint-Pol-sur-Ternoise
Counts of Saint-Pol, a list of the counts of the county of Saint-Pol